The Black Tavern is a 1972 Hong Kong wuxia film directed by Teddy Yip and produced by the Shaw Brothers Studio, starring Shih Szu.

Cast
Shih Szu as Zhang Caibing
Tung Li as Zha Xiaoyu
Ku Feng as Zheng Shoushan
Kong Ling as Jinglu
Kwok Chuk-hing as Jinghong
Barry Chan as Jinghu
Yeung Chi-hing as Hai Gangfeng
Dean Shek as wandering monk
Wang Hsieh as Gao Sanfeng
Yue Fung as Sanniang, a robber and daughter of the inn owner
Situ Lin as Doggie
Law Hon as tavern cook
Lee Ho as Iron Arm Liu Tong
Wu Ma as leader of Xiangxi Five Ghosts
Yau Ming as Three-headed Cobra
Chiang Nan as skilled robber
Liu Wai as Hu
Chan Chan-kong as Hu's partner
Yeung Chak-lam as robber
Chu Gam as Tai'an
Unicorn Chan as Three-headed Cobra
Yuen Wah as Xiangxi Ghost
Sa Au as Xiangxi Ghost / constable
Ho Kei-cheong as constable
Mars as Official Hai's servant
Jackie Chan as Official Hai's servant
Ling Hon as restaurant book keeper
Yi Fung as waiter
Cheung Hei as restaurant guest
Wong Yuet-ting as restaurant guest
Gam Tin-chue as restaurant guest

References

External links

The Black Tavern on Hong Kong Cinemagic

1972 films
Hong Kong martial arts films
1970s action films
1970s Mandarin-language films
Shaw Brothers Studio films
Wuxia films
1970s Hong Kong films